Rani Samyuktha is a 1962 Indian Tamil-language historical romance film directed by D. Yoganand. The film stars M. G. Ramachandran as Prithviraj Chauhan and Padmini as the eponymous queen. It was released on 14 January 1962, and performed averagely.

Plot 

Prithvirajan falls in love when he sees a portrait of princess Samyuktha. To insult him, her father Jayachandran installs his statue at the entrance to the palace hall where the svayamvara (a ceremony to choose the bridegroom) by the princess is to take place. Getting wind of it, Prithvirajan rushes to the spot on a horse and carries away his sweetheart, while others present watch shocked and stunned.

Cast 

 M. G. Ramachandran as Prithviraj Chauhan
 Padmini as Rani Samyuktha
 M. N. Nambiar as Muhammad Ghori (guest appearance)
 Ragini as Amrawathi
 K. A. Thangavelu
 M. G. Chakrapani as Shankaroy
 M. N. Rajam as Bhawani
 M. Saroja
 S. V. Sahasranamam as Jaichandra

Production 
The story of Samyukta and Prithviraj Chauhan, a popular love story, had been filmed several times in Indian cinema. In 1942, it was made in Tamil, titled Prithivirajan, with P. U. Chinnappa and A. Sakunthala starring. Rani Samyuktha, the 1962 edition of the same story, was produced by A. C. Pillai, who was a small-time bank clerk.

Soundtrack 
The music was composed by K. V. Mahadevan, while the lyrics were written by Kannadasan.

Release and reception 
Rani Samyuktha was released on 14 January 1962, and performed averagely. Film historian Randor Guy wrote in 2015 that there was a talk among Ramachandran's close friends that a misunderstanding arose between him and the producer and that somewhat affected his performance in the film.

References

External links 
 

1960s historical romance films
1960s Tamil-language films
1962 films
Films directed by D. Yoganand
Films scored by K. V. Mahadevan
Films set in the Rajput Empire
Indian epic films
Indian historical romance films